Shahvaneh (also Romanized as Shāhvāneh) is a village in Oshnavieh-ye Shomali Rural District, in the Central District of Oshnavieh County, West Azerbaijan Province, Iran. At the 2006 census, its population was 665 made up of 116 families.

References 

Populated places in Oshnavieh County